Mansfield Rangi (8 March 1935 – 14 February 1987) was a New Zealand cricket umpire. He stood in one ODI game in 1976.

See also
 List of One Day International cricket umpires

References

1935 births
1987 deaths
New Zealand One Day International cricket umpires
Place of birth missing